Shams al-Munajjim Muhammad ibn Ali al-Wabkanawi was a 14th century Persian astronomer. From his name it is known he originated from Wābkana, Bukhara, but little else is known of his life. His zij is extant in four manuscripts. His book is written in Persian, even though its title is in Arabic. Another extant book by him, Kitāb‐i maʿrifat‐i usṭurlāb‐i shamālī is also written in Persian.

References

Sources
 

People from Bukhara
14th-century Iranian astronomers
Astronomers of the medieval Islamic world